The R351 road is a regional road in Ireland, located in County Galway.

References

Regional roads in the Republic of Ireland
Roads in County Galway